"Angel in the Snow" is a song by Norwegian band A-ha, released as the second single from their fifth studio album, Memorial Beach (1993). The single version of the song is only named "Angel". It was written as a wedding present for Lauren, the wife of principal songwriter and guitarist Paul Waaktaar-Savoy. It is customary at Norwegian weddings that the husband-to-be professes his love for the bride in a personally relevant manner, and "Angel in the Snow" was Paul's contribution. The single only reached number 41 on the UK Singles Chart. It also was going to be released in Germany but this was canceled.

Critical reception
Gavin Reeve from Smash Hits gave the song two out of five, writing, "The Scandinavian trio dust off their pop slippers to bring ud a lovely little ditty about an angel in the snow. [...] This quietly majestic effort confirms their position as the best band in Norway (beginning with an A)."

Track listing
 CD 1
"Angel in the Snow" (Acoustic Instrumental)* - 4:05
"Stay on These Roads - 4:45
"Manhattan Skyline" - 4:52
"Scoundrel Days" (Live) - 4:46

 CD 2
"Angel in the Snow" (Edit) - 3:45
"The Sun Always Shines on TV" (Live) - 4:53
"I Call Your Name" (Live) - 4:42
"Early Morning" (Live) - 3:40

* Note: Different from the version found on the "Dark Is the Night" single.

References

A-ha songs
1993 singles
Warner Records singles
1993 songs
Music videos directed by Howard Greenhalgh
Songs written by Paul Waaktaar-Savoy